

The Zincirlikuyu Cemetery is a modern burial ground residing on the European part of Istanbul, Turkey. It is administered by the Metropolitan Municipality. Many prominent figures from the world of politics, business, sports and arts rest here.

The cemetery is located on the Büyükdere Avenue in Zincirlikuyu, Şişli district between Esentepe and Levent neighborhoods. It is Istanbul's first cemetery established in a contemporary structure. Planned in 1935, the burial place reached in the 1950s to its boundaries of today.

A mosque within the cemetery, built and donated by the Turkish entrepreneur İbrahim Bodur, was opened to service on 2 April 2004. The mosque is specially constructed for burial prayers, and has a capacity of 500 people.

The office of the İstanbul Cemeteries Administration is located in the building at the entrance of the cemetery.

Over the gate of the cemetery a verse from the Qur'an reminds "Her canlı ölümü tadacaktır" (Every living thing will taste death).

Notable burials

Listed in alphabetical order of family names:

A
 Makbule Abasıyanık (1883–1963), writer and philanthropist
 Sait Faik Abasıyanık (1906–1954), short story writer
 Behiye Aksoy (1933–2015), singer                                                                                           
 Yıldırım Aktuna (1930–2007), psychiatrist and politician
 Zeki Alasya (1943–2015), actor and film director
 Sadri Alışık (1925–1995), film actor
 Cahit Aral (1927–2011), engineer and former government minister
 Oğuz Aral (1936–2004), political cartoonist
 Mübeccel Argun (1909–1982), sportswoman, teacher of physical education and radio presenter
 Cüneyt Arkin (1937–2022), actor and medical doctor
 Duygu Asena (1946–2006), columnist, best seller author and activist for women's rights
 Falih Rıfkı Atay (1894–1971), journalist, writer and politician

B
 Turhan Baytop (1920–2002), botanist
 Refet Bele (1881–1963), general
 Ekrem Bora (1934–2012), film actor
 Behice Boran (1910–1987), Marxist sociologist, politician and author
 Orhan Boran (1928–2012), comedian, radio and TV host
 Rıza Tevfik Bölükbaşı (1869–1949), philosopher, poet and politician
 Erol Büyükburç (1936–2015), pop music singer, composer and actor
 Erol Bulut (1955–2021), romantic surrealist painter, professor of fine arts

C–Ç
 İhsan Sabri Çağlayangil (1908–1993), politician, Minister of Foreign Affairs and Chairman of the Senate
 Faruk Nafiz Çamlıbel (1898–1973), poet and politician

D
 Belgin Doruk (1936–1995), film actress
 Gürdal Duyar (1935–2004), sculptor

E
 Nejat Eczacıbaşı (1913–1993), chemist and businessman
 Şakir Eczacıbaşı (1929–2010), pharmacist, photographer and businessman
 Çetin Emeç (1935–1990), journalist
 Refik Erduran (1928–2017), playwright, columnist and writer,
 Nihat Erim (1912–1980), jurist, politician and Prime minister
 Muhsin Ertuğrul (1892–1979), actor and director
 Suphi Ezgi (1869–1962), military physician and musicologist, componist

F
 Fahire Fersan (1900–1997), classical kemençe virtuosa
 Defne Joy Foster (1975–2011), Afro-American actress, presenter, VJ

G
 Ayşen Gruda (1944–2019), actress,
 Cemal Nadir Güler (1902–1947), cartoonist,
 Aysel Gürel (1929–2008), actress and lyricist
 Melahat Gürsel (1900–1975), 4th First Lady (1960–1966),
 Müslüm Gürses (1953–2013), singer and actor

H
 Fikret Hakan (1934– 2017), actor
 Vahit Melih Halefoğlu (1919–2017), politician and diplomat,

I–İ
 Rıfat Ilgaz (1911–1993), poet and story writer,
 Ayhan Işık (1929–1979), film actor                                                                 
 Erdal İnönü (1926–2007), scientist and statesman
 Abdi İpekçi (1929–1979), journalist and intellectual
 İsmail Cem İpekçi (1940–2007), politician, journalist and statesman
 Benal Nevzat İstar Arıman (1903–1990), poet, writer and politician being as one of the first 18 female members of the Turkish parliament
 Fatma Hikmet İşmen (1918–2006), agricultural engineer, socialist politician, former senator

J
 Remzi Aydın Jöntürk (1936–1987), film director, film producer, screenwriter, painter and poet

K
 Feridun Karakaya (1928–2004), comedy actor
 Refik Halit Karay (1888–1965), writer and journalist,
 Ömer Kavur (1944–2005), film director, film producer and screenwriter
 Orhan Kemal (1914–1970), novelist
 Neriman Köksal (1928–1999), actress
 Yaşar Kemal (1923–2015), novelist
 Ali Kılıç (1889–1971), officer of the Ottoman Army, politician and army officer of the Republic of Turkey
 Dündar Kılıç (1935–1999), mob boss
 Suna Kıraç (1941–2020), member of Koç family, businesswoman and museum founder,
 Levent Kirca (1948–2015), actor
 Lütfi Kırdar (1887–1961), Governor and Mayor of Istanbul, Minister of Health and Social Security
 Vehbi Koç (1901–1996), entrepreneur and once Turkey's wealthiest person
 Mustafa Koç (1960–2016), businessman and chairman of Turkey's largest congloromerate Koç Holding

M
 Şaziye Moral (1903–1985), stage, film and voice actress

N
 Behçet Necatigil (1916–1979), poet
 Muhterem Nur (1932–2020), film actress and pop music singer

O–Ö
 Meral Okay (1959–2012), actress and screenwriter
 Yaman Okay (1951–1993), actor
 Ali Fethi Okyar (1880–1943), diplomat, politician, Prime Minister and Speaker of the Parliament
 Vedat Okyar (1945–2009), footballer and sports journalist
 Gündüz Tekin Onay (1942–2008), footballer and coach of Beşiktaş J.K.
 Zeki Ökten (1941–2009), film director
 Coşkun Özarı (1931–2011), footballer and national team coach
 Attila Özdemiroğlu (1943–2016), composer and arranger.

R
 Türkan Rado (1915–2007), first ever Turkish female professor of jurisprudence
 Halit Refiğ (1934–2009), film director, film producer and screenwriter

S–Ş
 Mehmet Sabancı (1963–2004), businessman
 Sakıp Sabancı (1933–2004), entrepreneur and Turkey's second richest man
 Hasan Saka (1885–1960), politician and Prime minister
 Şükrü Saracoğlu (1887–1953) Prime minister and president of Fenerbahçe S.K.
 Türkan Saylan (1935–2009), Prof. Doctor, educator
 Timur Selçuk (1946–2020), singer, pianist, conductor and composer,
 Müzeyyen Senar (1918–2015), Turkish classical music singer
 Ömer Seyfettin (1884–1920), novelist
 Aydan Siyavuş (1947–1998), basketball coach
 Meriç Soylu (1973–2012), director
 Mümtaz Soysal (1929–2019), professor of constitutional law, political scientist, politician, human rights activist, senior advisor, columnist and author,
 Sevgi Soysal (1936–1976), female novelist
 Ruhi Su (1912–1985), folk music singer
 Kemal Sunal (1944–2000), film actor and comedian
 Atıfet Sunay (1903–2002), fifth First Lady of Turkey,
 Zati Sungur (1898–1984), stage magician
 Ferhan Şensoy (1951–2021), actor, playwright, theatre director and writer,
 Turgay Şeren (1932–2016), goalkeeper and football manager

T
 Naim Talu (1919–1998), economist, banker, politician and Prime minister
 Ali Tanrıyar (1914–2017), physician, politician, government minister and sports club president
 Safiye Ayla Targan (1907–1998), female singer
 Abdülhak Hâmid Tarhan (1852–1937), poet and playwright
 Necdet Tosun (1926–1975), actor
 Erdal Tosun (1963–2016), actor
 Gürdal Tosun (1967–2000), actor
 Ahmet Kutsi Tecer (1901–1967), educator, poet and politician
 Talat Tunçalp (1915–2017), Olympian road cyclist,
 Yusuf Tunaoğlu (1946–2000), footballer
 Reha Oğuz Türkkan (1920–2010), writer
 İlter Türkmen (1927–2022), diplomat and politician

U–Ü
 Selçuk Uluergüven (1941–2014), theatre, film and television series actor
 Nejat Uygur (1927–2013), actor, comedian

Y
 Hakkı Yeten (1910–1989), footballer and coach of Beşiktaş J.K.
 Yankı Özkan Yıldırır (1972–2014), business woman
 Kerem Yilmazer (1945–2003), actor

Footnotes

Cemeteries in Istanbul
Şişli
Sunni cemeteries